Cidanghiang inscription, also called Lebak inscription, is an inscription from the Tarumanagara kingdom, estimated to be from the 4th century CE. The inscription was found in 1947 on the bank of Cidanghiang River in Lebak village, Munjul district, in Pandeglang Regency, Banten, Indonesia. The inscription is written in the Pallava script and composed in the Sanskrit language.

Text 
This inscription mentions a king named Purnawarman, who used the title vikrānta, which indicates that he was a worshiper of Lord Vishnu. It consists only of two lines, transliterated as follows:

Translation 
The translation of this inscription according to philologist Poerbatjaraka (1952) is as follows:
 This is the conqueror of the three worlds (with his three steps), 
 his majesty King Pūrnavarman, the great king, the hero (and) to be the banner of all kings in the worlds

See also 
 Purnawarman
 Tarumanagara

References 

 Sanskrit inscriptions in Indonesia
 Tarumanagara
 Banten